Herbjørn Sørebø (25 April 1933 – 29 March 2003) was a Norwegian journalist and broadcasting personality for more than thirty years.

Biography
He was born in Fjaler. He started working for the Norwegian Broadcasting Corporation in 1964, first for the radio, and later for the television. His speciality was Norwegian politics, as a reporter from the Parliament. From 1988 to 1990 he headed the daily evening news programme Dagsrevyen. Sørebø published more than 40 books during his career. He had his own column in the weekly newspaper Dag og Tid  from 1975 until his death in 2003.

He was chairman of the board of the news agency Nynorsk Pressekontor from 1975 to 1985. Among his books is the poetry collection Bønder spelar ikkje tennis from 1972, and the autobiography Medieliv from 2003.

Sørebø retired in the fall of 2001. In 2003, he received the King's Medal of Merit  in gold.

References

External links
NRK Sogn og Fjordane

1933 births
2003 deaths
People from Fjaler
NRK people
20th-century Norwegian poets
Norwegian male poets
Norwegian memoirists
Norwegian columnists
20th-century Norwegian male writers
Recipients of the King's Medal of Merit
20th-century Norwegian journalists
20th-century memoirists